APNI, Apni, or variant, may refer to: 

 Alliance Party of Northern Ireland
 Australian Plant Name Index

See also